The following is a complete list of school districts serving the city limits of Houston, Texas.

Aldine Independent School District
Alief Independent School District
Clear Creek Independent School District
Crosby Independent School District
Cypress Fairbanks Independent School District
Fort Bend Independent School District
Galena Park Independent School District
Houston Independent School District
Huffman Independent School District
Humble Independent School District
Katy Independent School District
Klein Independent School District
Lamar Consolidated Independent School District
New Caney Independent School District
North Forest Independent School District (annexed by Houston Independent School District as of June 13, 2013)
Pasadena Independent School District
Sheldon Independent School District
Spring Independent School District
Spring Branch Independent School District
Tomball Independent School District

Public education in Houston